Petar Grbić (Montenegrin Cyrillic: Петар Грбић; born 7 August 1988) is a Montenegrin professional footballer who currently playing for FK Budućnost Podgorica.

Club career

Mogren
In 2008, Grbić joined FK Mogren from Budva. At the time of Grbić's arrival, Mogren was an ambitious team with coach Branislav "Brano" Milačić and memorable generation of players from the Montenegrin national team involving the likes of Radoslav Batak, Ivan Janjušević, Janko Simović, Marko Ćetković, and Draško Božović. Grbić was a member of the Mogren squads which won the Montenegrin First League in 2009 and 2011.

Olympiacos
In July 2011, Greek side Olympiacos earned Grbić's signature in a €1 million transfer from Mogren. During the team's summer camp that year, coach Ernesto Valverde only employed Grbić as a substitute, preferring the likes of Kevin Mirallas. He spent the rest of his time at Olympiacos on loan, first to Levadiakos, followed by Hapoel Be'er Sheva, OFK Beograd, and finally to Partizan.

Loan to OFK Beograd
On September 5, 2012, it was announced that Grbić joined OFK Beograd in a six-month loan. On November 11, 2012, Grbić scored the winning goal in a match against Red Star Belgrade; it was OFK Beograd's first win over Red Star since 2003. Less than two weeks later, Grbić scored a brace against Red Star in the 2012–13 Serbian Cup quarter finals. After a great half-season with the Serbian team, the loan deal was extended to June 2013.

Partizan
On July 13, 2013, Grbić joined Partizan on loan from Olympiacos. In January 2014, Olympiacos officially traded Grbić to Partizan in an exchange for Marko Šćepović. On March 18, 2015, Grbić scored the opening goal in the 2015 Serbian Cup semi-final, after which he ran to his team's bench to put on a second left cleat. The stunt was meant as a response to Serbia's Prime Minister Aleksandar Vučić, who commented before the match that "some players in Partizan have two left legs". Vučić apologized on his Twitter profile and congratulated Grbić in his tweet.

Akhisar Belediyespor
In January 2016, Grbić moved to Turkish club Akhisar Belediyespor, where he initially saw playing time but was subsequently loaned to Adana Demirspor, a team which had just been promoted to the Turkish Süper Lig. In an interview with Serbian sports portal HotSport, Grbić suggested that the financial situation in Adana Demirspor was unstable at the time he left.

Budućnost
In December 2017, Grbić signed with Montenegrin club Budućnost.

He returned to the club in June 2019 after a year at Radnički Niš.

International career
Grbić made his debut for Montenegro in a March 2011 friendly match against Uzbekistan and has earned a total of 7 caps, scoring no goals. His final international was a March 2016 friendly against Belarus.

Personal
His younger sister Itana is a handball player. He is married and has two daughters.

Honours
Mogren
Montenegrin First League: 2008–09, 2010–11

Partizan
Serbian SuperLiga: 2014–15

References

External links
 
 

1988 births
Living people
Footballers from Podgorica
Association football forwards
Montenegrin footballers
Montenegro under-21 international footballers
Montenegro international footballers
OFK Titograd players
FK Mogren players
Olympiacos F.C. players
Levadiakos F.C. players
Hapoel Be'er Sheva F.C. players
OFK Beograd players
FK Partizan players
Akhisarspor footballers
Adana Demirspor footballers
FK Budućnost Podgorica players
FK Radnički Niš players
FK Mornar players
Montenegrin First League players
Super League Greece players
Israeli Premier League players
Serbian SuperLiga players
Süper Lig players
TFF First League players
Montenegrin expatriate footballers
Expatriate footballers in Greece
Montenegrin expatriate sportspeople in Greece
Expatriate footballers in Israel
Montenegrin expatriate sportspeople in Israel
Expatriate footballers in Serbia
Montenegrin expatriate sportspeople in Serbia
Expatriate footballers in Turkey
Montenegrin expatriate sportspeople in Turkey